The following is a list of mayors of Vancouver, Washington from 1858 on. The city of Vancouver was incorporated on January 23, 1857.

Notes

References

Vancouver, Washington